Vikravandi is a town in Viluppuram district in the Indian state of Tamil Nadu.

Geography

It has an average elevation of 44 metres (144 feet). The National Highway NH 132 connects Villupuram and Tindivanam, passes through Vikravandi and NH 36 connects Vikravandi and Manamadurai through Kumbakonam, Thanjavur and Pudukkotai. It is located at the distance of 154 km from Chennai, 14 km from Villupuram and 35 km from Pondicherry.

Demographics
 India census, Vikravandi had a population of 10,141. Males constitute 52% of the population and females 48%. Vikravandi has an average literacy rate of 74%, higher than the national average of 59.5%: male literacy is 81%, and female literacy is 66%. In Vikravandi, 10% of the population is under 6 years of age.

Transport

Road 
NH 36 connects Vikravandi and Manamadurai via Panruti – Neyveli – Kumbakonam - Thanjavur - Pudukottai  bypasses Villupuram at 5 km in Koliyanur.

References

Cities and towns in Viluppuram district